Burgy is a village in Saône-et-Loire, Bourgogne, France.

Burgy may also refer to:

 Carine Burgy (born 1970), French powerlifter
 Donald Burgy (born 1937), American artist
 Nicolas Bürgy (born 1995), Swiss football player
 The Burgies, Merseyside, England